Simão Pedro Soares Azevedo (born 31 May 1995), known as Simãozinho, is a Portuguese professional footballer who plays for F.C. Penafiel as a left-back and left winger.

Club career
Born in Trofa, Porto District, Simãozinho began his career at hometown club C.D. Trofense in the second division in 2014. He totalled 35 games in his first full season as a professional, scoring once in a 2–0 home win against FC Porto B on 9 November 2014.

Simãozinho transferred to S.C. Braga in July 2015, being assigned to their reserves in the same league. He made his debut for the first team on 20 January 2016 in a Taça da Liga group match away to Leixões SC, as a 68th-minute substitute for Stian Ringstad in a 4–0 victory.

On 24 June 2019, free agent Simãozinho signed with G.D. Estoril Praia still in the Portuguese second tier. The following transfer window, he joined fellow league side G.D. Chaves.

References

External links

Portuguese League profile 
National team data 

1995 births
Living people
Sportspeople from Trofa
Portuguese footballers
Association football defenders
Association football wingers
Liga Portugal 2 players
C.D. Trofense players
S.C. Braga B players
S.C. Braga players
G.D. Estoril Praia players
G.D. Chaves players
F.C. Penafiel players
Portugal youth international footballers
Portugal under-21 international footballers